Paweł Hlib (born 20 February 1986 in Poland) is a former motorcycle speedway rider from Poland.

Career
Hlib won the Team Speedway Junior World Championship in 2005, 2006 and 2007 and became the Individual Polish Under-21 Champion in 2007.

In December 2008, he joined the Poland national team. Hlib stated that he would like to join the German team because he has German citizenship as well.

He returned to ride in Poland during 2019, for Wilki Krosno. It was his final season in Poland.

Results

World Championship 

 Individual U-21 World Championship
 2006 - bronze medal
 2007 - Champion
 Team U-21 World Championship (Under-21 World Cup)
 2005 - World Champion (12 points in Semi-Final)
 2006 - World Champion (12 points)
 2007 - World Champion (10 points)

European Championship 
 Individual U-19 European Championship
 2003 - 11th place
 2005 - 4th place

Polish competitions 
 Individual U-21 Polish Championship
 2006 - Bronze medal
 2007 - Polish Champion
 Silver Helmet (U-21)
 2004 - Silver medal
 2005 - Silver medal

See also 
 Poland national speedway team
 Speedway in Poland

References 

1986 births
Living people
Polish speedway riders
German speedway riders
Coventry Bees riders
Team Speedway Junior World Champions
Sportspeople from Gorzów Wielkopolski